Mt. Blue High School is a public high school (grades 9–12) in Farmington, Maine, United States. The school is a part of the Mt. Blue Regional School District, and enrolls students from the Maine towns of Farmington, Weld, Temple, Wilton, Chesterville, New Vineyard, Industry, New Sharon, Starks, and Vienna. The school's athletic mascot is the cougar.

Electives available to students include classes in personal finance, advertising, foreign languages, creative writing, Shakespeare and drama, and a variety of Advanced placement courses.

In 2009 Mt. Blue changed from MSAD to Mt. Blue Regional School District (RSD), to start the new changes to the School. The state of Maine issued the school 63,568,833 dollars for the new school. The school was completely redone, and finished in 2013. The new school cover 226,000s square feet, 35.8% bigger than the old school. The school is three stories tall, and is the largest school in Franklin County.

Notable alumni
 David Chamberlain, NCAA All-American X-Country Skier
Kevin Eastler, four-time U.S. 20-km race walking champion
Eric Fearon, oncologist
Lance Harvell, state legislator
Melanie Sachs, social worker and politician
 Seth Wescott, professional snowboarder and first Olympic gold medalist

Ski team  
Mt. Blue High School is known as a statewide powerhouse in both Alpine and Nordic disciplines. The women's team holds the state record for the most consecutive state championships in any sport. They train at Titcomb Mountain in Farmington.

References

External links 
 

Public high schools in Maine
Schools in Franklin County, Maine
Farmington, Maine